Thomas Kelman Fleming,  FRSAMD (29 June 1927 – 18 April 2010) was a Scottish actor, director, and poet, and a television and radio commentator for the BBC.

Early life
Fleming was born in Edinburgh and attended Daniel Stewart's College, where the performing arts centre was renamed in his honour shortly after his death.

Career

Acting career
His acting career began in 1945.  His first professional performance was in Robert Kemp's Let Wives Tak Tent in 1947. Along with Kemp and Lennox Milne, he co-founded the Gateway Theatre in Edinburgh in 1953, before joining the Royal Shakespeare Company in 1962. That year he played the title role in William Gaskill's production of Cymbeline. In 1965, he founded a company at the Royal Lyceum Theatre in Edinburgh. He also became the director of The Scottish Theatre Company for most of its years in the 1980s. His film roles included a supporting part as the Catholic priest John Ballard in the period drama Mary, Queen of Scots (1971). On television, he played the title role in the 1956 BBC children's series Jesus of Nazareth.  In 1983, he played the part of Lord Reith, the BBC's first Director General, in a two-part BBC production written by Roger Milner, entitled simply Reith.

Presenting career
He was a commentator for the BBC telecast of the Edinburgh Military Tattoo from 1966 until 2008. He was the BBC commentator for the Eurovision Song Contest 1972 in Edinburgh. He was a commentator on BBC television coverage of state events, and provided commentary outside Westminster Abbey for the Coronation of Elizabeth II in 1953. He commentated on the annual National Service of Remembrance at the Cenotaph between 1966 and 1988, as well as royal weddings and funerals, for example the ceremonial funerals of Princess Diana and the Queen Elizabeth The Queen Mother.

Plays
 Miracle at Midnight, a nativity play staged by the Edinburgh Gateway Company in December 1958

Honours and awards
He was appointed an Officer of the Order of the British Empire in 1980 and a Commander of the Royal Victorian Order in 1998.

Fleming also received an Honorary Doctorate from Heriot-Watt University in 1984.

Personal life and death
Fleming, who never married, was organist, lay preacher, secretary and reader at the Canonmills Baptist church in Edinburgh. After a long illness he died in St Columba's Hospice in Edinburgh on the night of Sunday 18 April 2010, aged 82.

References

External links

The Edinburgh Sir Walter Scott Club
Gazetteer for Scotland
Obituary in 'The Scotsman'
Obituary in 'The Guardian'
Obituary in 'The Daily Telegraph'

1927 births
2010 deaths
Commanders of the Royal Victorian Order
Officers of the Order of the British Empire
Male actors from Edinburgh
Royal Shakespeare Company members
Scottish male stage actors
Scottish television presenters
Scottish theatre directors
People educated at Stewart's Melville College
20th-century Royal Navy personnel
British theatre directors